Francis Godolphin, 2nd Baron Godolphin (2 November 1706 – 25 May 1785) was a British politician and peer.

Life and career
He was the eldest surviving son of Henry Godolphin, provost of Eton and Dean of St Paul's, and was educated at Eton College (1718–1721) and Queen’s College, Oxford (1723). In 1733 he inherited his father's estates in Buckinghamshire.

He was appointed as Lieutenant-Governor of the Scilly Isles from 1739 to 1766 and as Governor from 1766 to his death. He served as Member of Parliament (MP) for the borough of Helston in Cornwall from 1741 to 1766, when he succeeded to the title of Baron Godolphin (of Helston) on the death of his cousin Francis Godolphin, 2nd Earl of Godolphin. He was also the recorder for Helston from 1766 to his death.

He married twice: firstly on 18 February 1733/4 at Saint James in Westminster, London, to Lady Barbara Bentinck, the daughter of William Bentinck, 1st Earl of Portland, and, secondly, to Lady Anne Fitzwilliam (22 Aug 1722 – 1805), the daughter of John Fitzwilliam, 2nd Earl Fitzwilliam, on 28 May 1747, also at St James, Westminster.

References

1706 births
1785 deaths
Alumni of The Queen's College, Oxford
Members of the Parliament of Great Britain for constituencies in Cornwall
Barons in the Peerage of Great Britain
Francis
British MPs 1741–1747
British MPs 1747–1754
British MPs 1754–1761
British MPs 1761–1768
Governors of the Isles of Scilly